Habishi may refer to:

 Habeshistan, a name for Abyssinia or Ethiopia
 Habesha peoples, people of Ethiopia and Eritrea
 Siddi or Habshi, people of African origin in India and Pakistan

Iran 
 Habishi, a village in Mollasani Rural District, in the Central District of Bavi County, Khuzestan Province
 Hoseynabad-e Hafashlu, a village in Akhtarabad Rural District, in the Central District of Malard County, Tehran Province

See also 
 Hobeish (disambiguation)